Thomas Kurzhals (13 December 1953 – 2 January 2014) was a German keyboardist, composer and rock musician, best known as a member of the bands Stern-Combo Meißen and Karat.

Kurzhals died from liver cirrhosis on 2 January 2014, aged 60, in Glauchau, Saxony.

References

External links

1953 births
2014 deaths
Musicians from Thuringia
German rock musicians
German keyboardists
German composers
Deaths from cirrhosis
Hochschule für Musik Carl Maria von Weber alumni
20th-century German musicians